Superstar is a 2021 Nollywood film released on 29 December 2021 by Inkblot Productions. The film stars an ensemble cast including Nancy Isime, Deyemi Okanlawon, Timini Egbuson, Daniel Etim Effiong, and Eku Edewor. Superstar was jointly produced by Inkblot Productions and FilmOne Production, marking the ninth collaboration between the two studios.

Plot 
An up-and-coming actress named Queen played by Nancy Isime experiences a rise to stardom and success as she faces the different challenges of life on her way to stardom. On her way to stardom, she is faced with different challenges and also faced with an occurrence from her past, her unyielding EX boyfriend, her new life, and stardom itself. Life just became a crossroad for Queen. The movie is an intriguing romance movie that exemplifies the growth and adventure of an upcoming actress in Nollywood and the various challenges on the road to Stardom as experienced by Queen.

Cast 
 Nancy Isime as Queen
 Timini Egbuson
 Eku Edewor
 Ufuoma McDermott
 Deyemi Okanlawon
 Daniel Etim Effiong
 Teniola Aladese
 Lord Frank

Production 
Superstar was jointly written by Akhigbe Ilozobhie, Uyoyou Adia and Chinaza Onuzo, and it was directed by Akhigbe Ilozobhie. The movie was released in December 2021, in turn, to also mark the 10th anniversary of Inkblot Production.

Award and nomination 
In the 8th edition of Africa Magic Viewers Choice Awards (AMVCA), Nancy Isime who played Queen in the movie was nominated under the category "Best Actress in a Drama" for her role but she lost to Osas Ighodaro.

References

External links 

2021 films
English-language Nigerian films
2020s English-language films